The 1986–87 season was FC Dinamo București's 38th season in Divizia A. Mircea Lucescu begins the reconstruction of the team, with players from Dinamo own's yard (Ionuț Lupescu, Bogdan Stelea or Bogdan Bucur), but also with an important transfer campaign. Among others, in this season are brought Dănuț Lupu from Dunărea Galați, Dorin Mateuț from Corvinul and Rodion Cămătaru from Craiova. The latter will be the topscorer in the championship.

Dinamo finishes the season on the second place, but 15 points behind Steaua, who ends the season without a single loss. In the Romanian Cup, Dinamo loses the final, against the same Steaua. In Europe, Dinamo plays again after 18 years in the Cup Winner's Cup, but loses in the first round against Albanian team 17 Nentori Tirana.

Results

Romanian Cup final

Cup Winners' Cup 

First round

17 Nentori Tirana won 3-1 on aggregate

Squad 

Goalkeepers: Dumitru Moraru, Benone Dohot, Florin Prunea, Bogdan Stelea, Florin Tene.

Defenders: Mircea Rednic, Ioan Andone, Alexandru Nicolae, Ioan Varga, Vasile Jercălău, Iulian Mihăescu, Bogdan Bucur, Nelu Stănescu, George Bănică, Virgil Mitici.

Midfielders: Ilie Balaci, Marin Dragnea, Dorin Mateuț, Lică Movilă, Dănuț Lupu, Ionuț Lupescu, Marcel Sabou, Alexandru Suciu, Nistor Văidean, Cristian Sava.

Forwards: Rodion Cămătaru, Marian Damaschin, Costel Orac, Florin Răducioiu.

Transfers 

Dinamo brought Ilie Balaci (FC Olt), Rodion Cămătaru (Univ. Craiova), Dorin Mateuț (Corvinul Hunedoara, in the winter break) and Dănuț Lupu (Dunărea Galați, in the winter break). Nelu Stănescu and Nistor Văidean were transferred to Flacăra Moreni (in the winter break). Stelea, Bogdan Bucur, Lupescu and Tene made their debuts.

References 
 www.labtof.ro
 www.romaniansoccer.ro

1986
Romanian football clubs 1986–87 season